Manzanita is a community of Bainbridge Island, Washington.  It is located on the waterfront on the west side of the island along Manzanita Road NE and the east shore of Manzanita Bay, including Little Manzanita Bay.

A 1908 home on the north shore of Little Manzanita Bay was owned at different times by the sons of George Westinghouse and Charles Lindbergh.

See also
 List of Bainbridge Island communities

References

Communities of Bainbridge Island, Washington